These are the late night schedules for the four United States broadcast networks that offer programming during this time period, from September 1988 to August 1989. All times are Eastern or Pacific. Affiliates will fill non-network schedule with local, syndicated, or paid programming. Affiliates also have the option to preempt or delay network programming at their discretion.

Legend

Schedule

Monday-Friday

Saturday

Sunday

By network

ABC

Returning Series
Nightline

Not Returning From 1986-87
The Dick Cavett Show
Jimmy Breslin's People

CBS

Returning Series
CBS Late Night
CBS News Nightwatch

New Series
Top of the Pops

Not Returning From 1986-87
In Person from the Palace
Keep on Cruisin'

Fox

Returning Series
The Late Show

New Series
The Wilton North Report

NBC

Returning Series
Friday Night Videos
The George Michael Sports Machine
Late Night with David Letterman
Saturday Night Live
The Tonight Show Starring Johnny Carson

United States late night network television schedules
1987 in American television
1988 in American television